Palais Obizzi is a small baroque palace in Vienna, Austria.

Today it houses the Vienna Clock Museum (Uhrenmuseum).

External links
 Clock museum of Vienna

Obizzi
Baroque architecture in Vienna